The Spirit Award is an honorary award, one of the NAACP Theatre Awards, an American award scheme run by the NAACP to honor outstanding people of color in theater.

The Spirit Award is presented to an individual who is judged by NAACP members to bring energy, tenacity, innovation, commitment, talent, and of course, spirit, to the theater scene.

Award winners

References

External links
NAACP Theatre Awards

African-American theatre
NAACP Theatre Awards
Awards established in 1991
1991 establishments in the United States